Ernest Claude Allen (24 October 1910 – 8 June 1984) was an Australian politician who represented the South Australian House of Assembly seats of Burra from 1968 to 1970 and Frome from 1970 to 1977 for the Liberal and Country League and Liberal Party.

Allen was previously chairman of the District Council of Spalding from 1956 to 1964.

References

 

1910 births
1984 deaths
Members of the South Australian House of Assembly
Liberal Party of Australia members of the Parliament of South Australia
Liberal and Country League politicians
20th-century Australian politicians
Mayors of places in South Australia